Oristeo is an opera in a prologue and three acts by Francesco Cavalli. It was designated as a dramma per musica. The Italian libretto was by Giovanni Faustini.

The opera is notable for containing one of the first examples of a da capo aria, Udite amanti, sung by Corinta.

Performance history

It was first performed in Venice on the occasion of the inauguration of the Teatro Sant 'Apollinare on 9 February 1651.

Roles

References
Sources

Clinksdale, Martha Novak, " Oristeo ", The New Grove Dictionary of Opera, ed. Stanley Sadie (London, 1992) 

Operas
Operas by Francesco Cavalli
Operas based on classical mythology
1651 operas
Italian-language operas